Hinckley is a town in Leicestershire, England.

Hinckley may also refer to:

Hinckley (surname)
Hinckley Yachts, American manufacturer of recreational boats
Hinckley Vaovasa, New Zealand-born Romanian rugby union football player

Places
In the United States:
Hinckley, Illinois
Hinckley, Minnesota
Hinckley, Ohio
Hinckley Township, Medina County, Ohio
Hinckley, Utah

In the United Kingdom:
Hinckley, Leicestershire
Hinkley Point, Somerset

See also 
 Edmund Hinkly, an English cricketer
 Hinkley (disambiguation)